Hart Benton Holton (October 13, 1835 – January 4, 1907) was an American politician.

Born near Elkton, Maryland, Holton attended the common schools and Hopewell Academy of Chester, Pennsylvania.  He moved to Baltimore, Maryland in 1857 and taught school in Alberton, Maryland, from 1857 to 1873.  He served in the Maryland State Senate from 1862 to 1867, and later moved to Woodlawn, Maryland in 1873, where he engaged in the raising of blooded horses.

Holton was elected from the fifth district of Maryland as a Republican to the Forty-eighth Congress, and served from March 4, 1883, to March 3, 1885.  He was an unsuccessful candidate for reelection in 1884 to the Forty-ninth Congress and retired from public life, at which point he took up an interest in raising horses.  Holton died in Woodlawn in 1907, and is interred in Loudon Park Cemetery of Baltimore, Maryland.

References

1835 births
1907 deaths
Republican Party Maryland state senators
Republican Party members of the United States House of Representatives from Maryland
People from Elkton, Maryland
Schoolteachers from Maryland
19th-century American politicians
19th-century American educators